Tiruppur is another name of a city of Tamil Nadu, India.

Tiruppur may also refer to several places:
 Tiruppur (State Assembly Constituency), a legislative assembly that includes the city Tiruppur
 Tiruppur district, a district of the Indian state Tamil Nadu
 Tiruppur taluk, a taluk of Tiruppur district of the Indian state of Tamil Nadu
 Tiruppur Kumaran (1904–1932), an Indian revolutionary who participated in the Indian independence movement

See also 
 Tiruppur (film), a 2010 Tamil film